Turkish Engine Center (TEC) is a joint venture between Pratt & Whitney and Turkish Technic for the maintenance, overhaul and repair of turbofan aircraft CFM56 and V2500 engines.

TEC is located at Istanbul’s second international airport, Sabiha Gökçen Airport (SAW) on the Anatolian (Asian) part. TEC started operations in January 2010 and has an annual capacity of 200 shop visits per year. The facility occupies approximately 25,000 m² (250,000 square feet) which is larger than three soccer fields. TEC currently employs around 250 people. Its repair capabilities include an information technology system, enhanced with methodology for engine overhaul practices, that provide services to airline operators in Europe, Middle East, North Africa, and CIS countries.

Engine Maintenance Capabilities 
TEC has B1 rating capability which includes inspection, testing, repair, modification, and overhaul of the listed engines, including powerplant/EBU hardware and electrical harnesses.
Engine maintenance services are provided for the following types:

 CFMI CFM56-7B
 IAE V2500-A5

Part Repair Capabilities

TEC Repair Groups for CFM56 -(3C, 5C, 7B) and V2500 
 Combustion chamber full overhaul
 Honeycomb  repairs
 Composite repairs
 Fan case repairs

TEC Repair Processes 
Heat Treatment
 Welding
 Brazing
 Bonding
 Plasma/HVOF Coating
 Painting
 Machining (Lathing, Milling)

Certificates 
Turkish DGCA Approval JAR-145 / SHY-145 was acquired on 6 January 2010. Certification No: TR.145.032
FAA certification was granted as of 20 April 2010. Certification No: 33PY227B
EASA certificate was received as of 20 May 2010. Certification No is EASA.145.0512

Facility 
TEC’s facility is established on a total area of 10 hectares. Total closed area is 25,000 m² (250,000 square feet) with a workshop area of 16,000 m² (160,000 square feet)
TEC aircraft engine maintenance, repair and overhaul facility is designed and built to meet U.S. Green Building Council’s, LEED (Leadership in Energy and Environmental Design) “LEED Gold” standards. TEC’s LEED Gold certification was awarded in 29,July 2010. TEC is the first aviation related facility and second building with LEED Gold certification in Turkey.

Some of TEC's sustainability features within the facility are as follows:
 Building overall energy performance exceeds alike. Overall energy consumption from building operations is approximately 25% less than a typical energy efficient building based on ASHRAE standards.
 High performance, energy efficient windows providing daylight to the facility, reducing electricity requirements and reducing the need for additional cooling.
 Enhanced ventilation systems introduce at least 30% more fresh air to the interiors. The system is also controlled by CO2 sensors which maximize occupant comfort while saving energy.
 In addition to large window areas, solar tubes throughout the whole facility introduce daylight to 100% of the regularly occupied spaces.
 The lighting system is controlled by daylight sensors which dim the interior lights when there is a healthy level of light from outside.
 The cooling systems have been chosen so that the refrigerants used have no harm to the ozone layer.
 A highly sophisticated Building Automation System minimizes energy waster from human factors. The system also allows for immediate notification and intervention of the building maintenance team in the case of a problem.
 Roof manufactured with reflective material to keep the building cool.
 The adhesives, paints, and floor coverings have no or minimum Volatile Organic Compounds which prevents occupants from inhaling unhealthy particles, especially during the first couple of years of operation.
 More than 10% of the total materials used come from recycled source, reducing the need for raw material extraction.
 More than 40% of the total materials used come from local sources, reducing transportation based carbon emissions.
 Waste management during construction helped divert 78% of construction debris from landfills.
 Rainwater is being harvested from a large roof are into 500 m3 tanks. It is then filtered to municipality domestic water standards and being used throughout the facility as well as landscape irrigation. Overall water savings exceed 60%.
 Landscaping has been carefully designed to incorporate local and adapted plant species which require little or no water once established, while maintaining the beauty of the overall facility.
 Employee’s daily commute to work is managed through the use of company operated vanpools free of charge, which helps reduce carbon emissions due to daily commute by a calculated 62%.
 Light colored concrete is used for the roads around the facility instead of black asphalt to prevent excessive heat accumulation.

Milestones:
 15 July 2008, Ground Breaking Event
 10 October 2008, Official establishment at the trade registrar
 6 January 2010, Turkish DGCA JAR-145 / SHY-145 Approval
 30 April 2010, FAA Certification granted.
 21 May 2010, EASA Certification granted
 21 May 2010, First Engine Delivery to the Customer

Partners

Turkish Technic
Turkish Airlines Maintenance Center (Turkish Technic) is the Maintenance, Repair and Overhaul center of Turkish Airlines. It is based at Istanbul Atatürk International Airport (IST). Turkish Technic is operating in three hangars at IST and one hangar in Ankara Esenboğa International Airport (ESB) in a total enclosed area of 130,000 m² with a total workforce of about 3,000 employees. Turkish Technic has established a third new maintenance center at Sabiha Gökçen International Airport (SAW) on the Asian side of Istanbul.

Pratt & Whitney
A United Technologies Corp. company, Pratt & Whitney is a world leader in the design, manufacture and service of aircraft engines, industrial gas turbines and space propulsion systems. Pratt & Whitney reported an operating profit of $1.84 billion in 2009 on revenues of $12.58 billion. The company's 36,000 employees support more than 11,000 customers in 195 countries around the world.

References

Companies of Turkey